Mick Hoy is an Irish former footballer who played for Glenavon, Dundalk and Ireland. During the 1950s Hoy returned to his local club, Tandragee Rovers, where he worked as a coach with the senior and youth teams.

Irish international
When Hoy began his international career in 1937 there were, in effect, two Ireland teams, chosen by two rival associations. Both associations, the Northern Ireland - based IFA and the Irish Free State - based FAI claimed jurisdiction over the whole of Ireland and selected players from the whole island. Hoy was one of several players born in Northern Ireland who benefited from the FAI's attempts to establish their all-Ireland influence.

Between 1937 and 1939 Hoy made 6 appearances for the FAI XI. He won all of these caps while playing for Dundalk. Together with fellow Northerner, Tommy Donnelly, he made his international debut in a 3-2 away defeat to Norway on 10 October 1937 in a qualifier for the 1938 FIFA World Cup. He made his final appearance for the FAI XI on 23 May 1939 in a 1-1 draw with Germany. In 1939, together with Jimmy Dunne and Kevin O'Flanagan, he also played twice for the League of Ireland XI, helping them to 2-1 victories against an Irish League XI and a Scottish League XI.

Honours

Dundalk

Dublin City Cup
Winners 1937-38: 1
FAI Cup
Runners Up 1937-38: 1
Leinster Senior Cup
Runners Up 1938-39: 1

References

 The Boys in Green: The Fai International Story

External links
 Ireland stats
 Dundalk F.C. internationals
 Dundalk F.C. 1930s
 Tandragee Rovers

Year of birth missing
Possibly living people
People from Tandragee
Association footballers from Northern Ireland
Republic of Ireland international footballers from Northern Ireland
Ireland (FAI) international footballers
Glenavon F.C. players
Dundalk F.C. players
League of Ireland players
League of Ireland XI players
Irish Free State international footballers
Association football fullbacks